Energy Trust of Oregon is an independent nonprofit organization based in Portland, Oregon, that helps utility customers in Oregon benefit from efficient energy use  and generating renewable energy. Energy Trust offers services, cash incentives, and other energy solutions to customers of Portland General Electric, Pacific Power, NW Natural, Cascade Natural Gas, and Avista in Oregon  and customers of NW Natural in Washington.

History

In 1999, the Oregon Legislature  passed an electric industry restructuring law, SB 1149, with the intent of establishing a stable, consistent funding source for residential, commercial and industrial electric efficiency, renewable energy and market transformation programs.  The legislation requires the state’s largest investor-owned electric utilities to collect a 3% public purpose charge and authorized the Oregon Public Utility Commission, OPUC, to direct a portion of those funds to an independent, non-government entity.

In 2000 and 2001, the OPUC and interested parties helped form the nonprofit Energy Trust of Oregon. The nonprofit has an independent board of directors and operates consistent with a grant agreement with the OPUC.  In 2001, Energy Trust articles of incorporation and bylaws were adopted and the first executive director hired. Energy Trust also has three advisory councils—the Conservation Advisory Council, Renewable Energy Advisory Council and Diversity Advisory Council—to provide stakeholder perspectives on its programs, budgets and action plans.

Energy Trust began operation in March 2002, charged with investing in cost-effective electric energy efficiency, helping to pay the above-market costs of renewable energy resources, implementing market transformation programs, delivering services with low administrative and program support costs and maintaining high levels of customer satisfaction.

Funding 

Energy Trust is funded by customers of Portland General Electric, Pacific Power, NW Natural, Cascade Natural Gas and Avista.  Customers of these five utilities pay a dedicated percentage of their utility bills to support a variety of energy efficiency and renewable energy services and programs.

As a result of SB 1149, which applies to electric energy, PGE and Pacific Power collect a 3% public purpose charge from their customers to support:

 Energy conservation in K-12 schools delivered through school districts
 Low-income housing energy assistance delivered through Oregon Housing and Community Services
 Energy efficiency, renewable energy and market transformation programs for residential and business customers delivered through Energy Trust, an independent, third-party
 
Funding for natural gas efficiency comes from public purpose charges paid by Oregon customers of NW Natural, Cascade Natural Gas and Avista. This funding is provided pursuant to settlement agreements in OPUC proceedings. Energy Trust administers the funds through contracts established with NW Natural in 2003, Cascade Natural Gas in 2006 and Avista in 2017. In 2009, through an agreement with NW Natural  and the Washington Utilities and Transportation Commission, Energy Trust also began serving NW Natural's customers in Washington.

In 2007, the Oregon Legislature passed the Oregon Renewable Energy Act, SB 838.  Through the legislation, the collection of the 3% public purpose charge was extended from 2012 to 2026, and PGE and Pacific Power were allowed to seek additional electric efficiency funding above the 3% public purpose charge with the goal of avoiding the need to purchase more expensive electricity. Energy Trust receives supplemental funds authorized by the legislation.

Goals 
As part of its oversight of Energy Trust, the OPUC adopted performance measures against which to benchmark Energy Trust's performance. OPUC performance measures are typically updated annually.

Energy Trust provides the OPUC with quarterly and annual reports measuring actual performance against the target metrics. Energy Trust also maintains operational goals to maximize investments in its 2020-2024 Strategic Plan.

Programs 
In general, Energy Trust operates its programs through contracts with service providers. A volunteer, non-stakeholder board of directors oversees Energy Trust management, provides strategic and policy direction and approves the organization’s budget and major expenditures. The board carries out its oversight with guidance from three advisory councils: Conservation Advisory Council, Diversity Advisory Council and Renewable Energy Advisory Council.  
 
Energy Trust offers cash incentives for a variety of energy-efficiency improvements and renewable energy systems for homes, businesses, industrial facilities, agricultural operations and public and nonprofit buildings. Other assistance provided includes information, services and technical assistance to help ratepayers identify and prioritize projects that fit their budget and goals. Incentives and assistance are offered through the following program categories:

Residential 
 Existing homes and mobile homes
 New homes and manufactured homes
 ENERGY STAR® products: clothes washers and LEDs
 Solar electric systems

Commercial and Industrial 
 Existing buildings, including multifamily
 New buildings, including multifamily
 Industrial buildings and processes
 Agricultural operations
 Energy from renewable sources such as solar, organic waste and hydropower

Renewable Energy 
 Solar electric
 Biopower from wood waste, landfill and wastewater gas, manure and other organic sources
 Other sources, including hydropower and geothermal, and some instances of small-scale community wind

References

2001 establishments in Oregon
Organizations based in Portland, Oregon